Drasteria eubapta is a moth of the family Erebidae. It is found in North America, where it has been recorded from Arizona and California.

The wingspan is about 31 mm. Adults have been recorded on wing from March to April and in September.

References

Drasteria
Moths described in 1926
Moths of North America